Baindt is a municipality in the district of Ravensburg in Baden-Württemberg in Germany. It was home to Baindt Abbey which ruled a secular principality in the Holy Roman Empire.

Sister cities
 Brest, Belarus

References

Ravensburg (district)